Oliver Hill (born 1989) is a British para-snowboarder and former motorcycle racer. He competes in snowboarding events for athletes with lower limb disabilities. Hill came third in the banked slalom events at the 2022 Winter Paralympics and 2021 World Para Snow Sports Championships.

Early life
Hill is from Reading, England. He began snowboarding at the age of eight, and later also competed in motocross, and the Triumph Triple Challenge superbike competition. In December 2018, he was involved in a car accident which resulted in his right leg being amputated. In March 2019, he received a prosthetic leg.

Career
Hill competes in snowboarding events for athletes with lower limb disabilities. In 2020, Hill joined GB Snowsport. He came second at the 2020-21 World Cup event in Pyhätunturi, behind fellow Briton James Barnes-Miller. Hill finished second overall in the 2021 World Para Snowboard World Cup, with a best finish of second at an event in Colere, Italy. At the 2021 World Para Snow Sports Championships held in Lillehammer, Norway, Hill and Barnes-Miller won the bronze medal in the men's team event. He also came fourth in the individual banked slalom event, after losing the bronze-medal race to Australian Ben Tudhope.

At the 2022 Winter Paralympics, he won the bronze medal in the banked slalom event. He was the first Briton to win a snowboarding medal at the Paralympics. He was third after the first run in the event, and did not improve on his second run. During the Paralympics, Hill had switched off his phone and chosen to avoid social media.

References

1989 births
Living people
British male snowboarders
British motorcycle racers
British amputees
Snowboarders at the 2022 Winter Paralympics
Medalists at the 2022 Winter Paralympics
Paralympic medalists in snowboarding
Paralympic bronze medalists for Great Britain
21st-century British people